Thomas Davies FRS FLS (c. 1737 – 16 March 1812) was a British Army officer, artist, and naturalist.

He was born  in Shooter's Hill (London), England and died 16 March 1812 in Blackheath (London). He rose to the rank of Lieutenant-general in the Royal Artillery. He studied drawing and recorded military operations in water-colours during several military campaigns in North America. He later became a noted artist and naturalist. He was the first to illustrate and describe the superb lyrebird.

His work was not well known until after a 1953 auction from the Earl of Derby's library. His paintings were later shown as part of a major exhibition, 2 July – 4 September 1972, at the National Gallery of Canada.

Early life
Very little is known of his early life. In his will, he lists his father as David Davies from Shooter's Hill.

Military service
Davies began military service at the Royal Military Academy, Woolwich in 1755. There he received training in topographic drawing to provide detailed and accurate drawings for military use. By 1757 he became second lieutenant in the Royal Artillery and began service abroad in Canada.

French and Indian War
His earliest work is a drawing of Halifax during the failed Louisbourg expedition in 1757. The next year, he recorded the military operations during the Siege of Louisbourg, including the Expulsion of the Acadians.

Starting in 1759, he was with General Jeffery Amherst's forces, first at the Fort Ticonderoga and then at Fort Crown Point. In 1760, he fought in the attack against Montreal and commanded a boat in a naval battle, which he also illustrated.

Davies's 1760 painting A View of Fort La Galette, Indian Castle, and Taking a French Ship of War on the River St. Lawrence, by Four Boats of One Gun Each of the Royal Artillery Commanded by Captain Streachy contains a large amount of documentary information—not only about the fort, but also the river battle and the clothing worn by Indigenous observers. In 1755, 3,000 Haudenosaunee lived at Fort La Galette.

After the attack against Montreal, he surveyed the regions surrounding Lake Ontario for several years, producing both military maps and artistic landscapes. He painted a series of waterfalls, including views of Great Seneca Falls and Niagara Falls. His 1762 watercolour of Niagara Falls, An East View of the Great Cataract of Niagara,  was the first eyewitness painting and the first accurate view of the falls.

American Revolutionary War
In 1776, Davies returned to North America with General William Howe during the American War for Independence. After the Battle of Long Island in August, he illustrated the British fleet in the harbour. Later that year, he continued with General Howe at the Battle of White Plains and the subsequent Battle of Fort Washington, where he illustrated the battle scene.

Under the command of General Charles Cornwallis at the Battle of Fort Lee, Davies captured the landing at and ascent of the Palisades by the British forces. This work has sometimes been attributed to Lord Francis Rawdon, since he later bought it from Davies.

In 1777, he was sent to command Fort Knyphausen, previously known as Fort Washington. In 1780, he returned to England.

Royal Artillery command
After the war, he received several promotions and was assigned to command posts in Gibraltar, the West Indies, and Canada. In 1799, he was appointed colonel commandant of the Royal Artillery. His last promotion was to the rank of lieutenant-general in 1803.

Artist and naturalist

In 1781, he was elected a fellow of the Royal Society. He was also a fellow of the Linnean Society of London and contributed several articles, especially regarding ornithology in Australia. In 1800, he was the first to illustrate and describe the superb lyrebird, in the Transactions of the Linnean Society of London. He also read reports to the society on the southern emu-wren of Australia and the meadow jumping mouse of Canada.

Style
Davies' style combines the precision of military artists with the skills of naturalists. His works have been compared to those of Henri Rousseau, George Edwards, and Paul Sandby.

Publications

Gallery

References

Bibliography
 Brandon, Laura. War Art in Canada: A Critical History. Toronto: Art Canada Institute, 2021. ISBN 978-1-4871-0271-5.

External links 

1737 births
1812 deaths
Military personnel from London
British Army personnel of the French and Indian War
British Army personnel of the American Revolutionary War
18th-century Canadian painters
18th-century male artists
Canadian male painters
19th-century Canadian painters
Fellows of the Royal Society
Fellows of the Linnean Society of London
Royal Artillery officers
British Army lieutenant generals
British bird artists
British ornithologists